The Lyric Theater is a historic theater in Miami, Florida at 819 Northwest Second Avenue. It served Miami's African American community. On January 4, 1989, it was added to the U.S. National Register of Historic Places.

History

After opening in 1913, the Lyric Theater quickly became a major entertainment center for blacks in Miami. The 400-seat theater was built, owned and operated by Geder Walker, a black man from Georgia. In 1915, The Miami News described it as, "possibly the most beautiful and costly playhouse owned by Colored people in all the Southland." The Lyric Theater served as a symbol of black economic influence, as well as a social gathering place free of discrimination.  It was a source of pride and culture within Overtown.

Walker came to Miami prior to 1900. The theater anchored the district known as "Little Broadway," an area alive with hotels, restaurants and nightclubs frequented by black and white tourists and residents. It served the community as a movie and vaudeville theater for almost fifty years, and was a symbol of black economic influence – free of discrimination – and a source of pride and culture within Overtown.

After his death in 1919, Walker's wife Henrietta continued to operate the Lyric which was also used as a community auditorium. School children and civic groups performed on its stage and special events such as commencement ceremonies were held there. Visiting luminaries like Mary McLeod Bethune, Ethel Waters, and the Fisk Jubilee Singers lectured and sang at the Lyric.

The Lyric continued to operate as a movie theater until 1959 when it became a church of the General Assembly of the Church of the Lord Jesus Christ of the Apostolic Faith. When Overtown began to deteriorate in the 1960s the Lyric Theater closed and would remain shuttered for decades.

The Black Archives, History and Research Foundation of South Florida, Inc. acquired the Lyric Theater in 1988. By 1989, the Theater, the lone surviving building in "Little Broadway," was listed in the National Register of Historic Places, and Phase 1 of restoration of the former showplace began. In 2000, after extensive rehabilitation, the newly restored Lyric Theater opened once again to audiences.

In 2004, Phase 2 of reconstruction was completed, with the construction of a new lobby, box office, concession area and offices for the theater. Phase 3, expansion of the Lyric Theater, is currently underway and includes construction of: a studio theater/meeting space, additional wing space and a fly loft for the stage itself, a catering kitchen, a loading dock, a scene shop, archival administration offices, exhibition space, and other backstage operational areas. The theater officially reopened to the public in February 2014.

Renamed the Black Archives Historic Lyric Theater Cultural Arts Complex, it is now the oldest legitimate theater in Miami. Adjacent to the central downtown business district of Miami, it is an anchor site of the Historic Overtown Folklife Village. The Lyric Theater is once again a symbol of black economic influence, as well as a social gathering place and a source of pride and culture.

References

External links

 Dade County listings at National Register of Historic Places
 Florida's Office of Cultural and Historical Programs
 Dade County listings
 Lyric Center

African-American history in Miami
National Register of Historic Places in Miami
Theatres on the National Register of Historic Places in Florida
Culture of Miami
1913 establishments in Florida
Theatres completed in 1913
Historically African-American theaters and music venues